Richard John Killeen  (born 1946) is a significant New Zealand painter, sculptor and digital artist.

Biography
Killeen was educated at the Elam School of Fine Arts, where his lecturers included Colin McCahon, before graduating in 1966. He has won a number of awards, including the QE2 Arts Fellowship, and has been the subject of several major exhibitions. He is particularly known for his arranged collections of aluminium 'cut outs' hung on walls, from 1978 onwards, and has continued arrangements of objects in this style. In the 2002 Queen's Birthday and Golden Jubilee Honours, he was appointed an Officer of the New Zealand Order of Merit, for services to painting.

Style 
His early cut-outs reflected Killeen's "discontent with the compression caused by the four static points of the frame," and an answer was found in their "off-stretcher presentation." These are created from cardboard templates, which he uses to cut aluminium sheeting, lacquer, and paint.

References

Further reading
 Francis Pound, The Escape from the Frame: Richard Killeen's Cut-Outs, in Art New Zealand magazine (No.20: Winter 1981)
 Book of the Hook, Christchurch Art Gallery

External links

Richard Killeen home page
Artist page at Museum of New Zealand Te Papa Tongarewa
Richard Killeen's page on the Bowerbank Ninow artist database
Artist collection page at Christchurch Art Gallery
Official artist page for Killeen's Auckland dealer gallery, Ivan Anthony
Works shown at Brooke Gifford Gallery

1946 births
Living people
New Zealand artists
Modern painters
Modern sculptors
Officers of the New Zealand Order of Merit
20th-century sculptors